José María Carpenter Aponte (4 May 1830 – 3 June 1905) was a Peruvian prelate of the Roman Catholic Church. He served as Auxiliary Bishop of Lima, Peru from 1891 until his death in 1905.

Biography 
Carpenter Aponte was born on 4 May 1830 in Arequipa, Peru. He was ordained a deacon on 4 July 1869, and was ordained a priest on 11 July 1869.

On 4 June 1891 he was appointed Auxiliary Bishop of the Archdiocese of Lima and Titular Bishop of Lorea. He was consecrated a bishop on 8 October 1891. He was the principal consecrator of Bishop Manuel Segundo Ballón Manrique in 1897, and co-cosecrator of Bishops Fidel Olivas Escudero, Ezechiel Francisco Soto, and Mariano Emilio Holguin y Maldonado, in 1900, 1901, and 1904, respectively.

He died on 3 June 1905, at the age of 75.

References 

1830 births
1905 deaths